Herman John Young (April 14, 1886 – December 13, 1966) was a professional baseball player. Young played in nine games in Major League Baseball in the 1911 season with the Boston Rustlers.

Young was born in Boston, Massachusetts, on April 14, 1886. He began his professional baseball career on February 27, 1911, when the Boston Rustlers signed him as a free agent. After making his major league debut on June 11, he played in eight more games with Boston, collecting nine hits in 25 at bats in his short career. Young was used as a third baseman in five games, and as a shortstop in three games.

Young played in his final game with Boston on June 23, and he was purchased by the Haverhill Hustlers of the New England League on July 22. He played for Haverhill for the remainder of the 1911 season, and for all of 1912. In 1913, he played for the Springfield Ponies of the Eastern Association. He would not play again after that season.

He died at the age of 80 on December 12, 1966, and was buried at Mount Hope Cemetery in Boston.

References

External links

Major League Baseball infielders
Boston Rustlers players
Haverhill Hustlers players
Springfield Ponies players
Baseball players from Massachusetts
1886 births
1966 deaths